I Smell Panties was an American comedy hip hop duo from Los Angeles, California, that consisted of Tyler, the Creator and Jasper Dolphin.

History 

Tyler, the Creator and Jasper Dolphin were founding members of the Los Angeles hip hop collective Odd Future, founded in 2007. They released their only EP, I Smell Panties, on June 28, 2008. They were featured on the song "Lisa" off Odd Future's debut mixtape, The Odd Future Tape.

They have not released material together as I Smell Panties since The Odd Future Tape in 2008.

I Smell Panties EP 

I Smell Panties is the only extended play by I Smell Panties. It was self-released on June 28, 2008. The track "Lisa" was later released on Odd Future's debut mixtape, The Odd Future Tape, released on November 15, 2008.

Track listing 

 All tracks are produced by Tyler, the Creator.

References 

American musical duos
Hip hop duos
Musical groups disestablished in 2008
Musical groups established in 2007
Musical groups from Los Angeles
Tyler, the Creator